This article gives information on liberalism worldwide. It is an overview of parties that adhere to some form of liberalism and is therefore a list of liberal parties around the world.

Introduction
The definition of liberal party is highly debatable. In the list below, it is defined as a political party that adheres to the basic principles of political liberalism. This is a broad political current, including left-wing, centrist and right-wing elements. All liberal parties emphasise individual rights, but they differ in their opinion on an active role for the state. This list includes parties of different character, ranging from classical liberalism to social liberalism, conservative liberalism to national liberalism.

Several conservative and/or Christian-democratic parties, such as the British Conservative Party, Germany's Christian Democratic Union and Spain's People's Party, are also considered to be neoliberal leaning or have strong liberal conservative and/or classical liberal factions, whereas some conservative parties, such as Poland's Law and Justice and Hungary's Fidesz, while favour more state intervention also support free market/free market solutions. Conversely, some social-democratic parties, such as the British Labour Party and the Italian Democratic Party, include liberal elements. Social liberalism and social conservatism are not mutually exclusive either, in fact some parties espouse socially liberal economic policies, while maintaining more socially conservative or traditionalist views on society: examples of this include Finland's Centre Party (see also Nordic agrarian parties) and Ireland's Fianna Fáil, both members of the Alliance of Liberals and Democrats for Europe Party (ALDE Party). In the United States, the two major political forces, the Republican Party and the Democratic Party, are to some extent, liberal (see Liberalism in the United States and Modern liberalism in the United States).

Many liberal parties are members of the Liberal International and/or one of its regional partners, such as the ALDE Party in Europe, the Liberal Network for Latin America and the Council of Asian Liberals and Democrats. Generally, membership in these international organizations is an indication that that party is indeed liberal. However, other international organisations, such as the International Democrat Union and the Centrist Democrat International, and regional organisations, such as the European People's Party, the Alliance of European Conservatives and Reformists, the European Democratic Party and the Christian Democrat Organization of America, also have liberal or liberal leaning parties as significant proportions of their membership.

Not all the parties using the "Liberal" or "Freedom" labels are actually liberal. Moreover, some parties, such as the Freedom Party of Austria, were originally liberal, but have since tilted toward a populist direction and abandoned most of the tenets of liberalism. Finally, some parties, such as the United States Republican Party, Australia's Liberal Party or Norway's Progress Party are liberal mainly from an economic point of view rather than a social point of view (see economic liberalism, libertarianism and right-libertarianism).

International organizations of parties
 Liberal International
 Alliance of Liberals and Democrats for Europe Party
 Liberal Network for Latin America
 Council of Asian Liberals and Democrats
 Africa Liberal Network
 Arab Liberal Federation

Parliamentary parties and other parties with substantial support
This list includes also parties that were represented in the last previous legislature and still exists as well as some banned or exiles parties (Cuba). Liberals might be active in other parties, but that is no reason to include a party.
See the remarks above about the criteria. Minor parties are listed below

Africa
Liberalism is a relatively new current for Africa. Traditionally it only existed more or less in Egypt, Senegal and especially South Africa.
 : There are very few liberal political parties. Ahd 54 and the Algerian Natural Law Party may be considered liberal. The main Berber party, the Rally for Culture and Democracy could be considered to embrace some liberal values.
 : the Liberal Democratic Party (member LI) is a small liberal party.
 : the Rebirth Party of Benin, might be considered a liberal party, but its exact profile is not available. The Cowry Forces for an Emerging Benin are a centrist party alliance with liberal elements.
 : the Alliance for Democracy and Federation, might be considered a liberal party, but its exact profile is not available.
 : the Movement for Democracy (member CDI), is a liberal and Christian-democratic party
: the Future of Congo (French: Avenir du Congo) is a liberal party of the current Prime Minister
 : the Free Egyptians Party (Hizb El Masriyin El Ahrar) and the New Wafd Party (Hizb al-Wafd-al-Jadid) could be considered "liberal parties". The newest liberal party in Egypt is El-Ghad Party (Tomorrow's Party) led by the opposition leader Ayman Nour . Also, the newly established Free Egyptians Party. See for more information: Liberalism in Egypt.
 : the National Democratic Union of Equatorial Guinea (member LI) claims to be a liberal party.
 : the United Democratic Party, might be considered a liberal party, but its exact profile is not available.
 : the New Patriotic Party is a right of center liberal party that is unclear about its international affiliations.
 : the Union of Democratic Forces of Guinea (member LI, ALN) and the Union of Republican Forces (member LI, ALN) are the main opposition parties.
 : the Rally of the Republicans (member LI, CDI) is the liberal, main government party.
 : the Orange Democratic Movement (observer LI) might be considered a liberal party.
 : the liberal character of the United Democratic Front is despite its membership of the LI disputable. The Democratic Progressive Party was formed in 2005 by President Bingu wa Mutharika after a dispute with the UDF. There were allegations that members of the former governing UDF did not adequately tackle corruption. It is unclear if the party will be ideological or personalist in style.
 : two center-right parties, the Constitutional Union and the Popular Movement are both member of the LI. However both are conservative in social issues, something abnormal for a true liberal party. The National Rally of Independents (observer LI, member ALN), founded in 1978 as a royalist party, is nowadays a liberal party.
 : the Liberal and Democratic Party of Mozambique and the Social Liberal and Democratic Party claim to be liberal parties, but both lost parliamentary representation.
 : the Senegalese Democratic Party (member LI) is a liberal party with a strong personalist character. See for more information: Liberalism in Senegal. 
 : the Seychelles National Party (observer LI) is a liberal party.
 : the People's Movement for Democratic Change (member ALN, observer DUA) can be considered as a liberal party. It is the country's third largest party but lost parliamentary representation in 2012.
 : the Democratic Alliance (member LI) is a liberal party. See for more information: Liberalism in South Africa. 
 : the Liberal Party of Sudan (member ALN, AAFD) is a social-liberal party struggling for human rights and a social market economy.
 : the Civic United Front, member LI) and the United Democratic Party, observer LI are liberal parties.
 : the Social Liberal Party (observer LI) is a more or less liberal party.
 : the main opposition party, the United Party for National Development (observer LI) takes a liberal position in the political spectrum.
 : liberalism is not organized, but the left-leaning opposition Movement for Democratic Change includes liberals and social democrats opposed to the ruling ZANU–PF party.

The Americas
In many Latin American countries, liberalism and radicalism have been associated with generally left-of-center political movements such as Colombia's Liberal Party, historically concerned mostly with effecting government decentralization and regional autonomy (liberals were influential in the total dissolution of at least two defunct countries, the United Provinces of Central America and Gran Colombia) and separation of church and state. At times, the anti-clerical and secularist stances promoted by Latin American liberals have resulted in limitations on the civil rights of clergy or others associated with the Church (as in Mexico, where law still prohibits priests from public office). Liberalism in North America has a different background.
 : the Radical Civic Union historically was a centrist progressive-liberal party, while nowadays it adheres to the Socialist International and its platform is a combination of liberal and social democratic ideas. The UCR's long-time rivals have been Peronism and the Peronist-inspired Justicialist Party. Recreate for Growth had been a short lived attempt to form a market liberal party and has observer status in the Liberal International. This party was in alliance with conservative-liberal Republican Proposal. Also smaller parties, such as the Union of the Democratic Centre, the Progressive Democratic Party, the Liberal Party of Corrientes and the Democratic Party of Mendoza, adhere to conservative-liberal principles. On the libertarian side, stands the Liberal Libertarian Party (dissolved) and the Libertarian Party (now) whose focus is on free markets and individual rights.
 : the character of the Aruban Liberal Organization (Organisacion Liberal Arubiano) is not clear. The party lost parliamentary representation in the 2005 election.
 : the dominant party is the left of center liberal Progressive Liberal Party.
 : the Liberal Party was dominant until 1952. (Main article: Liberalism in Bolivia).
 : Liberalism (in a general, international acceptance) is represented only by the recently founded New Party. There are no mainstream parties currently holding unambiguous liberal principles nor any members of the Liberal International. While at least three parties label themselves as "liberal", the Liberal Front Party (Partido da Frente Liberal), renamed Democrats in 2007, is actually a conservative party. The Liberal Party, is a populist-conservative party with links to religious organizations, and the Social Liberal Party is a conservative party. (Main article: Liberalism in Brazil).
 : Liberal refers mainly to the policies and ideas of the Liberal Party of Canada/ (member LI), the most frequent governing party of Canada for the last century and one of the most successful liberal parties in the world. The Liberal Party of Canada has generally adhered to modern liberalism, supporting a welfare state, and is regarded as a centrist to centre-left party in the Canadian context although some provincial parties such as the British Columbia Liberal Party and Quebec Liberal Party combine liberalism with conservative ideas. (Main article: Liberalism in Canada).
 : the Social Democrat Radical Party (member SI) was originally a left-of-center liberal party, but nowadays it is a social democratic party. The Liberal Party of Chile (member LI) is a left-of-center social liberal party. Political Evolution (Evopoli) is a center-right political party, part of the governing coalition and a member of RELIAL. (Main article: Liberalism and radicalism in Chile).
 : the liberal current developed into the Colombian Liberal Party (despite its name an active member of the SI), which is a left of center, somewhat populist party, somewhere between liberalism and social democracy. Newer parties like Partido Cambio Radical and Social National Unity Party have taken classical liberal ideas. (Main article: Liberalism in Colombia).
 : the Libertarian Movement Party (observer LI) is a classical liberal (libertarian) party.
 : it has been legal to form political parties since 1992, but only the Communist Party of Cuba is allowed to be the ruling party. The three liberal parties Liberal Democratic Party (observer LI), Democratic Solidarity Party (Partido Solidaridad Democratica, observer LI), Cuban Liberal Union (Unión Liberal Cubana, member of the Liberal International) and the Cuban Liberal Movement (Movimiento Liberal Cubano) are located in Havana, but they are not allowed to participate in elections.
 : the originally left-wing Dominican Liberation Party developed into a center liberal party. The Liberal Reformist Party (Partido Reformista Liberal) is also a center liberal party.
 : the Alfarista Radical Front (Frente Radical Alfarista) and the Ecuadorian Radical Liberal Party are two small remainders of the traditional liberal current. (Main article: Liberalism and radicalism in Ecuador).
 : Atassut is a right-of-center liberal party. The Democrats and the Cooperation Party are social liberal parties. They all oppose separation from Denmark. 
 : the National Democratic Congress is a center liberal party.
 : the Liberal Party of Honduras (Partido Liberal de Honduras, member LI and RELIAL) is the traditional center liberal party. (Main article: Liberalism in Honduras).
 : liberalism is represented by the New Alliance Party, member LI). (Main article: Liberalism in Mexico).
 : the liberal character of the right-wing Constitutionalist Liberal Party (former member LI) is disputable. (Main article: Liberalism in Nicaragua).
 : the Nationalist Republican Liberal Movement is a center-right liberal party. (Main article: Liberalism in Panama).
 : the Authentic Radical Liberal Party (member LI and RELIAL) is a center liberal party. (Main article: Liberalism and radicalism in Paraguay).
 : the only political party to advocate classical liberalism is Liberty Movement, founded in 1987, revamped in 2003; We Are Free; Humanist List; Independence Party; Liberal Party; National Union or Radical Party; Liberal Party of Peru; Progressive Club.  In Fujimorian-occupied Peru: social liberal Justice Party.
 : the Popular Democratic Party is a left of center liberal party.
 : the Democratic Alternative '91 is a center liberal party.
 : the People's National Movement is a liberal centrist to centre-left party.
 : the primary use of the term liberal is at some variance with European and worldwide usage. In the United States today, it is most associated with the definition of modern liberalism, which is a combination of social liberalism, public welfare and a mixed economy, which is in contrast to classical liberalism. The Democratic Party was the party of free trade, low tariffs and laissez-faire economics (though with relatively consistent advocacy for the rights of working-class supporters, which persists to the present), while the Republican Party advocated national citizenship, protectionism, mercantilism, and government efforts to stabilize the currency (as well as a relatively consistent support for the interests of their upper-class and pro-business supporters which persists to the present). Liberalism in the United States was primarily defined by the self-proclaimed liberal presidents Woodrow Wilson and Franklin Roosevelt. While the emphasis on mutual collaboration through liberal institutions as an alternative to the threat and use of force remained consistent with international liberalism, United States liberals also claimed that individuals have a right to expect the government to guarantee social justice. This was in part a consequence of the influence of the ideas of British economist John Maynard Keynes on Franklin D. Roosevelt's New Deal. The New Deal had the effect of stealing the thunder of social democratic forces and the necessity to prevent social unrest strengthened this development. As the term socialism was (and is still) commonly perceived as communistic (as in the ideology of the USSR), many to the left of center moderated their views, aligning with the New Deal liberals. The Democratic Party is identified as the liberal party within the broader definition of liberalism thus putting it in contrast with most other parties listed here. Democrats advocate more social freedoms, affirmative action, and a mixed economy (and therefore modern liberalism). The Republican Party experiences a somewhat fractured economic viewpoint with some members supporting strong free-market and libertarian views (and therefore economic liberalism) and others championing pro-business and economic nationalist stances, though both sectors typically mix their fiscal views with strong aspects of social conservatism. The Libertarian Party is the third largest political party in the United States, (though still only getting 1–2% of the vote in congressional elections), and particularly centers itself on free markets and individual liberty, which is more in line with classical liberalism. (Main article: Liberalism in the United States and Modern liberalism in the United States)
 : liberalism organized itself in the nineteenth century in the Colorado Party nowadays a heterogeneous party, divided in factions ranging from conservative to social-democratic; however, its general profile is more or less liberal. (Main article: Liberalism in Uruguay).
 : liberalism was a strong force in the nineteenth and beginning of the twentieth century. Nowadays there are three important classical liberal movements (still no parties): Organization for the Liberal Democracy in Venezuela, a classical liberal, pro-capitalism think-tank; Liberal Democratic Movement (Movimiento Demócrata Liberal) and "Rumbo Propio para el Zulia" from Maracaibo, Zulia, a classical liberal autonomist movement. They are going to create together a political party in the next years. (Main article: Liberalism in Venezuela).

Asia
Liberalism has or had some tradition in some countries. Nowadays it is a growing current in East Asia, but in many of these countries liberals tend not to use the label liberal.
Armenia, Azerbaijan, Cyprus, Georgia, Russia, and Turkey are listed under Europe.
 : the Bangladesh Liberal Democratic Party is a small liberal democratic party.
 : the Candlelight Party (member CALD), claims to be a more or less liberal party, though some dispute this and consider it a xenophobic party.
 : the Democratic Party is a liberal party, strongly emphasizing the need of democratic reforms. The Civic Party is also a liberal party. The Liberal Party is often considered to be a conservative, pro-business party.
 : Liberalism is currently unrepresented. However two centrist parties, INC and NCP have been described as liberal.(Main article: Liberalism in India).
 : liberalism is forbidden and its members have been killed in the past. The Liberal Democratic Party of Iran is forced to exist in exile (based in Sweden). (Main article: Liberalism in Iran).
 : Yesh Atid (member of LI) is the second biggest party in the Israeli Parliament with a strongly anti-clerical, liberal ideology. In the early 2000s, some Likud and Labor members formed a new liberal party called Kadima. The center-right Likud calls itself a National-Liberal Party.
 : the word liberal is used by the main conservative party, the Liberal Democratic Party (Jiyu Minshuto). The Democratic Party (Minshintō) is a social liberal centrist party. The Liberal League (Jiyu Rengo) was considered to be a free-market liberal party. Your Party was a market liberal or libertarian party. (Main article: Liberalism in Japan).
 : The Democratic Party of Korea is a liberal party. The predecessors of Democratic Party, which included the disbanded Uri Party (Yeollin Uri Dang), the UNDP (Daetonghap Minju Sindang), Democratic Party), Democratic United Party and Creative Korea Party are liberal parties. But there are also cases like conservative-liberal parties such as the People Party and Bareunmirae Party that are allied with conservatives. (Main article: Liberalism in South Korea).
 : the National Liberal Party (Hizb al-Ahrar al-Watani) is a liberal pro-independence party.
 : the Parti Gerakan Rakyat Malaysia (Malaysian People's Movement Party, member CALD) seems to be a more or less liberal party.
 : the Civil Will–Green Party (Irgenii Zorig-Nogoon Nam, member LI, CALD, GG) was founded in 2012 by a merger of the market liberal Civil Will Party (Irgenii Zorig Nam) and the Mongolian Green Party (Mongolyn Nogoon Nam) who both had worked for protecting human rights and democracy. The new party combines market liberal and green values.
 : the National League for Democracy, observer CALD, a party with liberal democratic elements, became the biggest parliamentary party at the latest election. It won a parliamentary majority in the 1990 election but the result was not recognised by the military and the party was suppressed until 2012.
 : the Pakistan Peoples Party is a progressive center left political party.
 : the Liberal Party, member LI, CALD) is a center liberal party. (Main article: Liberalism in the Philippines).
 :  the populist, liberal Singapore Democratic Party (member CALD) is not represented in parliament. 
 : the Liberal Party of Sri Lanka is a small liberal party.
 : the Democratic Progressive Party (Min-chu Chin-pu Tang, member LI, CALD) is a left-liberal party. The Taiwan Solidarity Union is a characterised primarily by its Taiwanese nationalism and derives its membership from both the Chinese Nationalist Party's former moderate and Taiwan-oriented fringe and DPP supporters disgruntled by the party's moderation on the question of Taiwanese sovereignty. Its liberal character is questionable, although it is part of the DPP's left-of-centre and pro-Taiwanese Independence Pan-Green alliance (in contrast with the conservative Chinese Nationalist Party (Kuomintang) and People First Party.) (Main article: Liberalism in Taiwan).
 : the Democrat Party (Pak Prachatipat, member LI, CALD) is a conservative-liberal party. (Main article: Liberalism in Thailand).

Europe
At a pan-European level liberalism exists in some form within generally all members of the Alliance of Liberals and Democrats for Europe Party (ALDE), within most members of the European Democratic Party (EDP), within many members of the European People's Party (EPP) and some members of the Alliance of European Conservatives and Reformists (AECR).
 : Two parties could be considered to embrace liberal values: the Democratic Alliance Party (member LI, ALDE) and the Unity for Human Rights Party, which is the party of the ethnic minorities. (Main article: Liberalism in Albania.)
 : the Liberal Party of Andorra (member LI, ALDE) is a centre-right liberal party and currently the second-largest political party by parliamentary representation. 
 : traditional liberalism made a comeback following the 2018 Velvet Revolution. After the 2018 Armenian parliamentary election, Bright Armenia, a liberal political party, became the official opposition in the National Assembly and is a member of the ALDE. Following the 2021 Armenian parliamentary election, Bright Armenia lost all representation in the National Assembly and currently acts as an extra-parliamentary party. Other liberal parties in Armenia include the Armenian Constructive Party, Armenian National Movement Party, European Party of Armenia, For The Republic Party, Liberal Democratic Union of Armenia, and the Liberal Party. (Main article: Liberalism in Armenia.)
 : the NEOS – The New Austria and Liberal Forum (member ALDE) was formed in 2014 as a merger of NEOS formed in 2012 and the Liberal Forum (LiF) formed in 1993. The Liberal Forum had split from the Freedom Party of Austria (FPÖ), which had become a right-wing nationalist party, but was previously liberal or national-liberal, and was a member of the Liberal International until 1993. (Main article: Liberalism in Austria.)
: liberal parties are minor in regard to the political system. Liberal political parties in Azerbaijan include; Azerbaijan Democratic Party, Azerbaijan Liberal Party, Azerbaijan National Independence Party, Azerbaijani Popular Front Party, Justice Party, Modern Equality Party, Musavat and the Republican Alternative Party.
 : one of the main opposition parties is the liberal United Civic Party of Belarus.
 : the party system is divided by language. In the Flemish community, Open Flemish Liberals and Democrats (member LI, ALDE), comprising both market and social liberals, is one of the dominant parties. In the French community, the centre-right Reformist Movement (member LI, ALDE) is one of the major parties. Affiliated with this party is the Party for Freedom and Progress in the German community, and until 2011 DéFI a regionalist party in the Brussels region whose aim is the expansion of linguistic rights of French-speakers. (Main article: Liberalism in Belgium.)
 : liberalism is weak, because of the domination by ethnic parties. A small and rather unsuccessful liberal party is the Liberal Democratic Party (Liberalno demokratska stranka, associate ALDE). More successful is the social liberaI and multi-ethnic Our Party (Naša stranka, associate ALDE).
 : organized liberalism was initially quite unsuccessful. Liberalism is now represented by the mainly Turkish minority party Movement for Rights and Freedoms (Dviženie za prava i svobodi, observer LI, member ALDE) and the National Movement for Stability and Progress (Nacionalno Dviženie za Stabilnost i Vazhod, member LI, ALDE), both taking a more or less liberal position. (Main article: Liberalism and radicalism in Bulgaria.)
 : liberalism is very divided. One could distinguish five parties: the centre Croatian People's Party – Liberal Democrats (member ALDE), its two splinters: centrist People's Party – Reformists (member EDP) and the left-of-centre Civic Liberal Alliance (member ALDE); left centrist and Istrian regionalist Istrian Democratic Assembly (Istarski demokratski sabor – Dieta Democratica Istriana, member ALDE, observer LI) and the right-of-centre Croatian Social Liberal Party (member LI, ALDE). (Main article: Liberalism in Croatia).
 : the centre-right Liberal Democrats www.liberalscy.org (Fileleftheri Dimokrates, member of the Interlibertarians) and the centre-left United Democrats (Enomeni Dimokrates, member ALDE) are considered liberal parties. See also Liberalism in Cyprus.
 : the Czech Pirate Party, the Green Party, the Mayors and Independents and TOP 09 are considered liberal parties. (Main article: Liberalism in the Czech lands).
 : most parties support liberalism in one form or another, and three parties mark themselves as liberal: the centrist Social Liberal Party (member LI, ALDE), the much larger conservative-liberal Venstre (member LI, ALDE) and the liberal–libertarian Liberal Alliance. (Main article: Liberalism and radicalism in Denmark).
 : the Estonian Reform Party (member LI, ALDE) is a free market liberal party. The liberal character of the Estonian Centre Party (member ALDE) can be disputed. (Main article: Liberalism in Estonia).
 : the conservative-liberal Union Party and the social liberal Self-Government (Faroe Islands) were or are aligned with the Danish liberal parties. In addition, there are two separatist parties: the liberal-conservative People's Party (Fólkaflokkurin, member AECR) and the market liberal Progress, founded in 2011.
 : the dominant LI and ALDE member party is the centrist and agrarian Centre Party (Suomen Keskusta), however the liberal character of this party is questioned. In actuality, the Centre Party has long since become socially more conservative than the liberal-conservative National Coalition Party, since it opted not to support same-sex marriage. The Swedish minority party Swedish People's Party (Svenska Folkpartiet i Finland, member LI, ALDE) has a clearer liberal profile. The original liberal current was until 2011 organized in the Liberals (Liberaalit), after 1995 a very small extra-parliamentary party. At the autonomous islands of Åland the Liberals for Åland (Liberalerna på Åland) and the centrist agrarian Ålandic Centre (Åländsk Center, member ALDE) are the dominant forces. (Main article: Liberalism and centrism in Finland).
 : the Radical Movement (MR, member ALDE) was formed in 2017 as a merger of the Radical Party (PR), founded in 1901, and the Radical Party of the Left (PRG), which had split from the PR in 1971. In 2019, the PRG re-emerged from the MR. France had a liberal tradition, generally associated to Republicanism, from which the right and the left of the political spectrum were generated. On the right-wing there were the Republicans, which organized themselves in 1901–03 in the moderate-liberal Democratic Republican Alliance and in the liberal-conservative Republican Federation; on the left-wing the Radicals, which founded the Republican, Radical and Radical-Socialist Party in 1901. After World War II, the Republicans gathered in the liberal-conservative National Centre of Independents and Peasants, from which the conservative-liberal Independent Republicans seceded in 1962. The original centre-left Radical Party was a declining force in French politics until 1972 when it joined the centre-right, causing the split of Radical-Socialist faction and the foundation of the Radical Party of the Left, closely associated to the Socialist Party. In 1978 both the Republican Party (successor of the Independent Republicans) and the Radical Party were founding components, along with the Centre of Social Democrats, of the Union for French Democracy (UDF), an alliance of liberal and Christian-democratic forces. The Republican Party, re-founded as Liberal Democracy in 1997 and re-shaped as a free-market libertarian party, left UDF in 1998 and merged into the Gaulist Union for a Popular Movement (UMP), of which it represented the libertarian wing. Also the Radical Party left UDF in 2002 in order to join UMP, of which it is the main social-liberal component, as an associate party. The Liberal Alternative was formed in 2006. In 2017, Emmanuel Macron formed the liberal party La République En Marche! and won the presidential and the National Assembly elections. The Democratic Movement (MoDem, member EDP), the successor of the Union for French Democracy, joined forces with La République En Marche!. (Main article: Liberalism and radicalism in France).
 : the United National Movement (Georgian: ერთიანი ნაციონალური მოძრაობა, member IDU, observer EPP) is a liberal-conservative pro-western party oriented on North-Atlantic integration. Lelo (Georgian: ლელო, member ALDE), Republican Party of Georgia (Georgian: საქართველოს რესპუბლიკური პარტია, member ALDE) and Free Democrats (Georgian: თავისუფალი დემოკრატები, member ALDE) are liberal pro-western parties.
 : the Free Democratic Party (Freie Demokratische Partei, member LI, ALDE) is a centre to centre-right classical liberal party. It supports laissez-faire and free market economics and is seen to be closer to the centre-right conservative CDU/CSU alliance on economic issues than the centre-left SPD, but closer to the SPD and the Greens on issues such as civil liberties, education, defense, and foreign policy. (Main article: Liberalism in Germany).
 : the Liberal Party of Gibraltar (member LI, ALDE) is a social-liberal party favouring Gibraltar's self-determination.
 : the liberal current disappeared, leading to liberals joining the centre-right New Democracy, est. in 1974 and the centre-left PASOK, est. in 1974. Smaller parties such as the social-liberal The River (Greek: Το Ποτάμι, To Potami) and the Union of Centrists (Greek:Ένωση Κεντρώων, EDP member, Enosi Kentroon), claimer of Venizelist heritage, became the leading liberal forces. Meanwhile, new liberal initiatives have been taken, like e.g. the purely liberal Liberal Alliance (Greek: «Φιλελεύθερη Συμμαχία», Fileleftheri Simmakhia), est. in 2007. (Main article: Liberalism in Greece).
 : the Momentum Movement (Momentum Mozgalom) is a centrist and liberal political party, the Hungarian Liberal Party (Magyar Liberális Párt) is an extra-parliamentary market liberal party. (Main article: Liberalism and radicalism in Hungary).
 : the Progressive Party (member LI) is an agrarian-centrist party. Bright Future (member ALDE), founded in 2012, is a social-liberal party favouring Iceland's membership in the EU. In 2016, the Reform Party emerged as a liberal split from the governing Independence Party. (Main article: Liberalism and centrism in Iceland).
 : Fine Gael (member CDI and EPP) is a centre-right, liberal-conservative party whose platform encompasses low-tax economic policies and socially liberal stances on issues such as same-sex marriage, abortion, divorce, medical cannabis, and assisted dying. In recent years the traditionally Irish nationalist centrist Fianna Fáil (member LI and ALDE) has adopted liberal politics on both social and economic ones; however, the party membership remains conservative on social issues. The Progressive Democrats were a liberal party with an emphasis on market economics in existence from 1985 to 2009.
 : the Liberal Vannin Party (observer LI) is the only party represented in the House of Keys since most Members are elected as independents. It favours accountability and transparency in government and a further devolution from the United Kingdom.
 : liberals are now divided over the centre-right Forza Italia (originally a merger of liberal and Christian-democratic forces in 1994, and reconstituted in 2013 from The People of Freedom), the Civic Choice party founded in 2013 to support then-Prime Minister Mario Monti, Democratic Centre and Alliance for Italy, small social-liberal parties, and various minor extra-parliamentary movements including the libertarian Act to Stop the Decline and Italian Radicals (member ALDE Party). Also the centrist-populist Italy of Values is a member ALDE Party, although it is not classifiable as a liberal party in whichever sense. Most members of the late Italian Liberal Party (refounded as a very small party in 2004) and many former members of the Italian Republican Party joined Forza Italia, which is often presented and defined in Italy as a liberal party. This is the reason why the term 'liberals' is more often used when speaking of the centre-right coalition, dominated by Forza Italia, which combines economic liberalism with freedom of conscience on ethical matters. (Main article: Liberalism and radicalism in Italy).
 : the New Kosovo Alliance (member ALDE), Liberal Party of Kosovo (associate ALDE), and the Alternative (Alternativa) are considered to be liberal parties, although the second one doesn't seem to have much support. The Independent Liberal Party (Samostalna liberalna stranka, member LI) is a liberal party of the Serbian minority.
 : the Development/For! is a classical-liberal political party (member ALDE). Development/For! has 13 seats in saeima.  Eliminated Latvia's First Party/Latvian Way party (member LI, ALDE) was a centre-right liberal party. (Main article: Liberalism in Latvia).
 : the Liberal Movemant and the Liberal and Centre Union (member LI), ALDE) are a centre liberal parties. (Main article: Liberalism in Lithuania).
 : the Democratic Party (//, member LI, ALDE) is the traditional liberal party. (Main article: Liberalism in Luxembourg).
 : the AD+PD was formed in 2020 as a merger of the green Democratic Alternative and the social-liberal Democratic Party. The party has 2 seats in the parliament and was formed by dissatisfied members of the Labour Party. There are two minor liberal parties: Alleanza Liberal-Demokratika Malta and Alpha Liberal Democratic Party.
 : liberalism is divided over the conservative-liberal Liberal Party (Partidul Liberal, member ALDE) and the market liberal Liberal Reformist Party (Partidul Liberal Reformator, observer LI), which splintered of the Liberal Party to stay in government and be part of the Pro-European Coalition in 2013. (Main article: Liberalism in Moldova).
 : liberalism is organized in the Liberal Party of Montenegro (Liberalna Partija Crne Gore, observer LI, member ALDE), more or less a liberal party. (Main article: Liberalism in Montenegro).
 : liberalism is divided between two parties. The social-liberal Democrats 66 (member LI, ALDE) and the conservative-liberal People's Party for Freedom and Democracy (member LI, ALDE). Furthermore, in 2004 the GroenLinks started profiling itself as a 'leftist liberal' party, a shift from its socialist roots. (Main article: Liberalism in the Netherlands).
 : the liberals are divided over the Liberal Democratic Party (member LI, ALDE), part of the left of centre government coalition, and the Liberal Party of Macedonia, part of the right of centre opposition coalition. (Main article: Liberalism in North Macedonia).
 : the Liberal Party (member LI, ALDE) is a centrist liberal party. The Capitalist Party is a newer party grounded in classical liberalism. (Main article: Liberalism in Norway).
 : the Democratic Party (member ALDE) was a centre-liberal party. It did not succeed in entering parliament in the 2005 election. Civic Platform is considered economically liberal or conservative-liberal, however, it is conservative in terms of ideology. Created in 2015, liberal Modern (member ALDE) entered parliament in 2015 elections. In Poland, there is also conservative and liberal party KORWiN, which was established in 2015 by Janusz Korwin-Mikke. It possesses two deputies in the European Parliament and also two MEPs in polish parliament. (Main article: Liberalism in Poland)
 : liberalism was a strong force in history, namely during the Liberal Revolution of 1820. In contemporary times, the Social Democratic Party was once an Liberal International member, but left the organisation in 1996, and has taken a more conservative orientation since then, joining the European People's Party. However, many observers still see it as a conservative-liberal party. The Earth Party (former member ALDE, WEP) is a party that advocates both market economy and environmentalism. The most recent party is Iniciativa Liberal that also became a member of the ALDE, in early December 2017. The party was created as an association in 2016, and was approved as a party by the Constitutional Court in 2017. The party was admitted to the ALDE in November 2017. The party ran for election for the first time in the 2019 European Parliament election in Portugal, garnering 0.9% of the votes, and failing to win any seats in the European Parliament. In the 2019 legislative election, the party won a single seat in the Portuguese Parliament in the electoral district of Lisbon, earning 67,681 votes in total, equivalent to 1.29% of the votes cast. (Main article: Liberalism in Portugal).
 : the National Liberal Party (member LI and ex-member ALDE) is a centre-right liberal party, part of the governing Social Liberal Union coalition from 2011 to 2014. (Main article: Liberalism in Romania).
 : Civic Platform (Russia) is a liberal party founded by Mikhail Prokhorov for Russia to have an "actual classic liberal free market party". Yabloko (Yabloko, Russian Democratic Party, Jabloko - Rossijskaja Demokratičeskaja Partija, member LI, ALDE) and the Right Cause (Pravoye Delo, member IDU) also contain ideas liberalism. While Yabloko is social liberal party, the Right Cause can be seen as a democratic conservative market party. The Liberal Democratic Party of Russia has been widely criticised for not being liberal, rather a nationalist, right-wing populist party. (Main article Liberalism in Russia).
 : the Popular Alliance (member EDP) is a centrist liberal party.
 : the Liberal Democratic Party is the only functioning liberal party, which had parliamentary representation until the 2013 Serbian general election. (Main article: Liberalism in Serbia).
 : Freedom and Solidarity (Sloboda a Solidarita) is a right of centre market liberal party. Progressive Slovakia (Progresívne Slovensko) is a social liberal political party and a member of the ALDE. (Main article: Liberalism in Slovakia).
 : the largest liberal party is the List of Marjan Šarec, member of the ALDE, a centrist liberal party. The second largest is the Party of Alenka Bratušek (member ALDE), a liberal spin-off from centre-left Positive Slovenia that went a more social democratic direction. The third largest is the classical-liberal Civic List (member ALDE). Two minor extra-parliamentary liberal parties in Slovenia are the Liberal Democracy of Slovenia (former member of both LI and ALDE), a centrist liberal party, and Zares, a social-liberal party, and also a former ALDE member. (Main article: Liberalism in Slovenia).
 : there was a long tradition of liberalism during the Trienio Liberal. This ended with absolutist and carlist movements and Francoist Spain in the 20th century. At a national level there were attempts to establish half liberal parties, but they did not succeed until Union, Progress and Democracy (Unión, Progreso y Democracia), a progressive, social liberal and centralist party. It was replaced as major social liberal party in 2015 by Citizens, which is autonomist and postnationalist. The Libertarian Party defends personal rights and economic freedom with a libertarian point of view. On a regional level, the Canarian Coalition and the Democratic Convergence of Catalonia (member ALDE) are nationalist, half-liberal parties (Main articles: Canovism, Liberalism and radicalism in Spain).
 : The Liberals (member LI, ALDE) is a centre-right liberal party. The Centre Party (member LI, ALDE) is a historically agrarian party that has gradually developed into a centre-right liberal party, since 2013 referring to themselves as such. (Main article: Liberalism and centrism in Sweden).
 : the main liberal party is FDP.The Liberals (member LI, ALDE), formed in 2007 by a merger of the Free Democratic Party of Switzerland and the Liberal Party of Switzerland. (Main article: Liberalism and radicalism in Switzerland).
 : liberalism was never a strong force. There is no popular support for liberalism. Populism is the dominant rhetoric. Liberal Democratic Party (Turkish: Liberal Demokrat Parti), a classical liberal party, was founded in 1994. It received very few votes in every election it participated in. (Main article: Liberalism in Turkey).
 : the position of liberalism is unclear. Voice (member ALDE) was founded in 2019. The Liberal Party (Liberalna Partia, observer LI) is a small liberal party. A clear liberal party was the Our Ukraine–People's Self-Defense Bloc (Naša Ukrajina), which was dissolved in 2012. (Main article: Liberalism in Ukraine).
 : liberalism is now represented mainly by the Liberal Democrats (member LI and ALDE), formed in 1988 from a merger of the Liberal Party formed in 1859 and the Social Democratic Party formed in 1981. The Liberal Democrats, which has hundreds of Councillors and 11 Members of Parliament, were the junior party in a governing coalition with the Conservative Party in 2010–2015. The Liberal Party was re-founded in 1989 and has several councillors in Britain, but no parliamentary representation.
: the Alliance Party of Northern Ireland (member LI, ALDE) was formed in 1970 as a non-ideological cross-community party. (Main article Liberalism in the United Kingdom)

Oceania
Liberalism has a strong tradition in both Australia and New Zealand.
 : the Liberal Party of Australia is considered to be centre-right, and largely the bastion of Liberalism in Australia. Within the Liberal Party, there is a fusion of liberal and conservative views, a tradition which began by the party's predecessors in the early 20th century. The fusion has led to the party having a big tent membership, bound by an anti-Labor position. Many would argue that this party is a classical liberal party and that the perception of what liberalism is has changed, not the Liberal Party (which promotes the free market approach). Former Australian Prime Minister Malcolm Turnbull, a member of the Liberal Party, said that his party is "not a conservative party". The term small-l liberal generally refers to someone who champions civil liberties and progressive causes such as reconciliation with Indigenous Australians. These views are represented strongly within the broad Liberal Party, as well as in parties such as the Australian Democrats, which began its life as a group of social-liberals disaffected with the Liberal Party. The Liberal Democratic Party is a classical liberal and libertarian party. (Main article: Liberalism in Australia).
 : the liberal Democratic Party is one of the two major parties opposing the nationalist Cook Islands Party.
 : there is no longer a pure liberal party, as in the past the Liberal Party was the first organised political party, and the Liberal Government from 1891 to 1912 was responsible for many reforms. Similarly to Australia, this party merged with more conservative and free market forces to form the National Party of New Zealand, in order to oppose the advancement of the democratic socialist New Zealand Labour Party. Liberalism nowadays refers to a support for individual liberties and limited government. The term is generally used with a reference to a particular policy area, e.g. "market liberalism" or "social liberalism". Unqualified liberalism is less common; in its extreme form it is known by the American term libertarianism. The left of centre New Zealand Democratic Party takes a more or less progressive liberal position in the spectrum, but lost popular support. ACT New Zealand is a classical liberal or libertarian party. (Main article: Liberalism in New Zealand).
 : the Solomon Islands Liberal Party considers itself a liberal party.

Non-parliamentary liberal parties
 Afghanistan: Liberal Democratic Party of Afghanistan
 Armenia: Armenian Liberal Democratic Party, Armenian Democratic Liberal Party, Liberal Democratic Union of Armenia
 Austria: The Democrats, The Social Liberals
 Benin: Liberal Democrats' Rally for National Reconstruction – Vivoten (Rassemblement des libéraux démocrates pour la reconstruction nationale – Vivoten)
 Canada: Libertarian Party of Canada
 Cyprus Liberal Democratic Party  member of the Interlibertarians International
 Ecuador: Movement Forwards Ecuador (Moviminiento Fuerza Ecuador, observer LI)
 France: Pole of freedoms, the French liberal movement, Liberal Alternative
 Greece: The Liberals
 Guatemala: Reform Movement (observer LI), Liberal Party of Guatemala
 Guinea: Parti de l'Unité et du Libéralisme Social (member ALN)
 Haiti Liberal Party
 India: Lok Satta Party
 Iran: Liberal Democratic Party of Iran
 Italy: Federation of Liberals (observer LI), Italian Liberal Party
 Kosovo: Liberal Party of Kosovo (observer LI, member ALDE)
 Laos: Lao Liberal Democratic Party
 Mongolia: Mongolian Liberal Democratic Party
 Moldova: National Liberal Party
 Netherlands: Liberal Democratic Party
 Netherlands Antilles: Democratic Party
 Norway: Liberal People's Party
 Peru: Liberty Movement, We Are Free, Independence Party, Humanist List, Liberal Party, National Union, Liberal Party of Peru, Justice Party (member LI)
 Portugal: Liberal Social Movement, Liberal Initiative
 Spain: Liberal Coalition, Mallorcan Union (member LI)
 Sri Lanka: Liberal Party of Sri Lanka (member LI and CALD)
 Turkey: Liberal Democratic Party (former member LI)
 United Kingdom: Liberal Party,
 United States: Libertarian Party, Personal Choice Party, Independence Party of Minnesota, Liberal Party, US Marijuana Party
 Uruguay: Liberal Party
 Venezuela: Organization for the Liberal Democracy in Venezuela, Civil Resistance, Democratic Liberal Movement, Rumbo Propio

See also
 Lists of political parties

References

External links
 Liberal Manifesto of Oxford 1947
 Liberal Declaration of Oxford 1967
 Liberal Manifesto of Oxford 1997